Jeffrey Gitomer (born February 11, 1946 in West Palm Beach, Florida) is an American author, professional speaker, and business trainer, who writes and lectures internationally on sales, customer loyalty, and personal development. He lives with his wife Jennifer Gluckow in Charlotte, North Carolina.

Education
Gitomer attended Temple University, but left after his first year to attend the Goethe Institute in Berlin, Germany, where he studied languages. In a Time Magazine feature article, Gitomer quips about his college education: "I went on the six-year you-don't-quite-graduate program, which I completed successfully."  The Charlotte Observer describes him as "...a college drop-out who has built a sales training empire."

Author/Writer
Gitomer has written fifteen books, including New York Times best sellers, The Sales Bible and The Little Gold Book of YES! Attitude. His most successful title, The Little Red Book of Selling, has sold more than five million copies worldwide and has been translated into 14 languages. It was also chosen by business publishing experts Jack Covert and Todd Sattersten to be listed in their book of The 100 Best Business Books of All Time.  All Gitomer's titles have reached #1 on Amazon.com, and collectively his books have appeared on major best-seller lists nationwide more than 750 times. "Gitomer has earned his bragging rights..." and has "...turned his blustery style into best-selling books." On September 16, 2006, four of Gitomer's titles appeared simultaneously on The Wall Street Journal best seller lists, the only business author to achieve this in the Journal's history. Of The Sales Bible, Covert comments: "Every once in a while, one book defines a category." Gitomer has also co-authored three other titles with writers Ron Zemke, Greg Dinkin, and Nikita Koloff.

Author David Dorsey writing in The Wall Street Journal comments: "What's especially solid about Mr. Gitomer's books is their grounding in ethics. Success, for him, comes from the heart. He reminds us that top sales reps don't peddle; they solve problems and make customers laugh while offering them something they genuinely need. If you want to be the best salesperson, first you must be the best person."

Gitomer also writes a syndicated column, Sales Moves, which is published worldwide in American and European business journals and newspapers, and is available online at www.gitomer.com. He has been a contributor to Entrepreneur Magazine, and many other business publications.

He also publishes Sales Caffeine, a weekly, multi-media e-zine (online magazine), which is distributed internationally to 250,000 subscribers.

Speaker
Gitomer has given more than 100 presentations annually for the past 19 years, including public and corporate seminars, annual sales meetings, and keynote addresses, and is ranked in the top 1% of non-celebrity speakers by the National Speakers Association. Gitomer's seminar circuit includes appearances in North America, South America, Europe, Asia, and Australia. On August 4, 2008, at the National Speakers Association Convention in New York, he was inducted into the Speaker Hall of Fame.

BIG CORPORATE CUSTOMERS. Jeffrey's customers include Coca-Cola, Adecco, Caterpillar, BMW, AT&T Wireless, MacGregor Golf, Ferguson Enterprises, HP, Kimpton Hotels, Hilton, Enterprise Rent-A-Car, AmeriPride, NCR, Stewart Title, Comcast Business, Time Warner Cable, Liberty Mutual Insurance, Principal Financial Group, Wells Fargo Bank, Baptist Health Care, BlueCross BlueShield, Carlsberg, Wausau Insurance, Northwestern Mutual, MetLife, Sports Authority, GlaxoSmithKline, AC Nielsen, IBM, The New York Post, and hundreds of others.

Online Training

Gitomer has created Gitomer Learning Academy, which provides online training in sales, customer loyalty, and personal development.

Praise

Gitomer's personal style is somewhat controversial, however in general he has received overwhelmingly positive response to his work as a writer, speaker, and educator. In a testimonial, Todd Horton, President of D.R. Horton writes: "As the nation's largest homebuilder, we have seen our sales grow, our customer loyalty enhanced, and our people's commitment re-doubled as a result of Jeffrey's unique style, wit, and great ideas combined with real-world sales answers." Atlanta Business Chronicle Publisher, Ed Baker, comments: "Jeffrey is a weekly staple for our readers. He's a dose of sales energy (and reality) that they can't find anywhere else. He truly helps people – in a very common sense way."

US Airways Controversy and Resolution

Gitomer gained notoriety in November 2003 for being the first passenger ever to be banned from US Airways. The airline cited chronic, unreasonable complaints, numerous confrontations with employees, and verbal abuse that allegedly brought employees to tears. In an interview, Gitomer described himself as a demanding, but not abusive, customer and cited only one time that he made an employee cry, several years prior. In October 2004, Gitomer was quietly perma-banned as a customer and passenger, having learned from the experience and documenting the negative outcome. All his frequent-flyer miles were restored.

After American Airlines merger and name change, Gitomer now stands as the only passenger ever banned on US Airways.

Honors and awards
 2009 Audie Award for The Little Red Book of Selling. Awards recognizing distinction in audiobooks. Best Business/Educational title of the year.
 2008 ASTD Award for Excellence in Workplace Learning and Performance, Solution Sales Elite, Hewlett Packard & TrainOne, partners.
 2008 IPPY Axiom Book Award Gold Medal Winner in Sales for Customer Loyalty Concepts.
 2008 National Speakers Association's CPAE Speaker Hall of Fame. One of 146 living members.
 2005 IPPY Top 10 Outstanding Book Award "Business Breakthrough Book of the Year" for The Little Red Book of Selling.
 1997 Certified Speaking Professional (CSP) Award by the National Speakers Association.

Bibliography

Print
 Gitomer, Jeffrey (November 12, 2019). Get Sh*t Done: The Ultimate Guide to Productivity, Procrastination, and Profitability. Wiley. 
 Gitomer, Jeffrey (December 7, 2015). The Very Little but Very Powerful Book on Closing: Ask the Right Questions, Transfer the Value, Create the Urgency, and Win the Sale. Wiley. 
 Gitomer, Jeffrey (September 2, 2013). Jeffrey Gitomer's 21.5 Unbreakable Laws of Selling: Proven Actions You Must Take to Make Easier, Faster, Bigger Sales....Now and Forever. Bard Press. 
 
 Gitomer, Jeffrey (March 19, 2011). Social BOOM!: How to Master Business Social Media to Brand Yourself, Sell Yourself, Sell Your Product, Dominate Your Industry Market, Save Your Butt, ... and Grind Your Competition into the Dirt. FT Press.

e-Books

Audio books
 Gitomer, Jeffrey. The Little Red Book of Sales Answers: 99.5 Real Life Answers that Make Sense, Make Sales, and Make Money. Unabridged. (Pub date: March 10, 2009) New York: Simon & Schuster
 Gitomer, Jeffrey. The Little Gold Book of YES! Attitude: How to Find, Build and Keep a YES! Attitude for a Lifetime of Success. Unabridged. (January 6, 2009) New York: Simon & Schuster
 Gitomer, Jeffrey. The Little Red Book of Selling: 12.5 Principles of Sales Greatness. Unabridged. (September 9, 2008) New York: Simon & Schuster
 Gitomer, Jeffrey. The Sales Bible New Edition: The Ultimate Sales Resource. Unabridged. (May 6, 2008) New York: Simon & Schuster

V-Books (video)
 Gitomer, Jeffrey. The Little Red Book of Sales Answers: 99.5 Real Life Answers that Make Sense, Make Sales, and Make Money. Unabridged. (Pub date: March 10, 2009) New York: Simon & Schuster
 Gitomer, Jeffrey. The Little Gold Book of YES! Attitude: How to Find, Build and Keep a YES! Attitude for a Lifetime of Success. Unabridged. (January 6, 2009) New York: Simon & Schuster
 Gitomer, Jeffrey. The Little Red Book of Selling: 12.5 Principles of Sales Greatness. Unabridged. (September 9, 2008) New York: Simon & Schuster 
 Gitomer, Jeffrey. The Sales Bible New Edition: The Ultimate Sales Resource. Unabridged. (May 6, 2008) New York: Simon & Schuster

Discography

Audio/CDs
 The 10.5 Commandments of Sales Success. (2008) Charlotte, North Carolina: Buy Gitomer, Inc.
 The Fiction and Non-Fiction about the Book Business. (2008) Charlotte, North Carolina: Buy Gitomer, Inc.
 Jeffrey Gitomer's Boot Camp. (2007) Charlotte, North Carolina: Buy Gitomer, Inc.
 The Best of Customer Satisfaction Is Worthless, Customer Loyalty Is Priceless. (2005) Charlotte, North Carolina: Buy Gitomer, Inc.
 Customer Loyalty. (2004) Charlotte, North Carolina: Buy Gitomer, Inc.
 Power Networking: Real-World Lessons for Networking Your Way to Rich Relationships. (2003 revised 2008) Charlotte, North Carolina: Buy Gitomer, Inc.
 The Force: How to Find, Hire, Train, Build, Pay, and Keep a First Class Team of Salespeople on Fire. (2003 revised 2008) Charlotte, North Carolina: Buy Gitomer, Inc.
 Instant Sales: A Condensed Sales Course. (2002) Charlotte, North Carolina: Buy Gitomer, Inc.
 Got Attitude? (2001) Charlotte, North Carolina: Buy Gitomer, Inc.
 Position, Don't Compete: Strategic Positioning in a Competitive Market. (1999 revised 2008) Charlotte, North Carolina: Buy Gitomer, Inc.
 Cold Calling: How to Break the Ice and Get the Money. (1999 revised 2008) Charlotte, North Carolina: Buy Gitomer, Inc.

Teleseminar/CDs
 Sales Revival Teleseminar. (2009) Charlotte, North Carolina: Buy Gitomer, Inc.
 What Are You Giving Yourself For Christmas? Teleseminar. (2006) Charlotte, North Carolina: Buy Gitomer, Inc.
 Voicemail Teleseminar. (2006) Charlotte, North Carolina: Buy Gitomer, Inc.
 Sell Value, Not Price Teleseminar. (2005) Charlotte, North Carolina: Buy Gitomer, Inc.
 Sales Manager Teleseminar. (2005) Charlotte, North Carolina: Buy Gitomer, Inc.
 Objection Cure and Prevention Teleseminar. (2004) Charlotte, North Carolina: Buy Gitomer, Inc.
 Making Powerful Connections Teleseminar. (2004) Charlotte, North Carolina: Buy Gitomer, Inc.
 Local Market Dominance Teleseminar. (2003) Charlotte, North Carolina: Buy Gitomer, Inc.
 How To Have Your Best Year Ever Teleseminar. (2003) Charlotte, North Carolina: Buy Gitomer, Inc.
 How NOT to Lose the Sale to Price Teleseminar. (2003) Charlotte, North Carolina: Buy Gitomer, Inc.
 Mining for Prospects Teleseminar. (2002) Charlotte, North Carolina: Buy Gitomer, Inc.
 How Different Are You? Teleseminar. (2002) Charlotte, North Carolina: Buy Gitomer, Inc.
 Getting the Appointment Teleseminar. (2002) Charlotte, North Carolina: Buy Gitomer, Inc.
 Close the Sale Teleseminar. (2002) Charlotte, North Carolina: Buy Gitomer, Inc.
 Creativity Teleseminar. (2001) Charlotte, North Carolina: Buy Gitomer, Inc.
 C-Level Selling: Insider Secrets Teleseminar. (2001) Charlotte, North Carolina: Buy Gitomer, Inc.
 Customer Loyalty Live! Teleseminar. (2001) Charlotte, North Carolina: Buy Gitomer, Inc.
 Overcoming Holiday Objections Teleseminar. (2001) Charlotte, North Carolina: Buy Gitomer, Inc.
 Bids, Quotes, Proposals Teleseminar. (2000) Charlotte, North Carolina: Buy Gitomer, Inc.
 Buying Motives Teleseminar. (2000) Charlotte, North Carolina: Buy Gitomer, Inc.
 Asking Powerful Questions Teleseminar. (2000) Charlotte, North Carolina: Buy Gitomer, Inc.
 The 12 Most Important Answersl Teleseminar. (2000) Charlotte, North Carolina: Buy Gitomer, Inc.

Video/DVDs
 Jeffrey Gitomer's Las Vegas Success Weekend. (2007) Charlotte, North Carolina: Buy Gitomer, Inc.
 C-Level Secrets: Selling at the Highest Level. with Gerhard Geschwandtner. (2006) Charlotte, North Carolina: Buy Gitomer, Inc.
 Little Red Book of Sales Answers iPod Video: 99.5 Real-World Answers. (2005) Charlotte, North Carolina: Buy Gitomer, Inc.

Courseware – Online
Gitomer, Jeffrey. The Little Red Book of Selling Online Course. (September 2008) Charlotte, North Carolina: Jeffrey Gitomer's TrainOne
Gitomer, Jeffrey. Personal Development Online Course. (November 2007) Charlotte, North Carolina: Jeffrey Gitomer's TrainOne
Gitomer, Jeffrey. Customer Loyalty Online Course. (April 2006) Charlotte, North Carolina: Jeffrey Gitomer's TrainOne
Gitomer, Jeffrey. Sales Success Assessment Online. (October 2005) Charlotte, North Carolina: Jeffrey Gitomer's TrainOne
Gitomer, Jeffrey. Core Selling Skills Level I Online Course. (September 2005) Charlotte, North Carolina: Jeffrey Gitomer's TrainOne
Gitomer, Jeffrey. Core Selling Skills Level II Online Course. (September 2005) Charlotte, North Carolina: Jeffrey Gitomer's TrainOne
Gitomer, Jeffrey. Core Selling Skills Level III Online Course. (September 2005) Charlotte, North Carolina: Jeffrey Gitomer's TrainOne
Gitomer, Jeffrey. Core Selling Skills Mini Course. (September 2005) Charlotte, North Carolina: Jeffrey Gitomer's TrainOne

References

External links
 
 SalesHQ – 5 Best Sales Authors of All Time 
 Jeffrey Gitomer Interview by Jim Canterucci 
 
 Roth Talent Profile 

Living people
American businesspeople
American columnists
American instructional writers
American motivational writers
1946 births
Writers from Charlotte, North Carolina